Janet Dixon Elashoff is a retired American statistician, formerly the director of biostatistics for Cedars-Sinai Medical Center and professor of biomathematics at the University of California, Los Angeles.

Early life
Janet Dixon was the daughter of mathematician and statistician Wilfrid Dixon.
She completed her Ph.D. in statistics at Harvard University in 1966; her dissertation was Optimal Choice of Rater Teams.

Career
She became a faculty member in the Department of Education and Statistics at Stanford University. With educational psychologist Richard E. Snow, she is the author of Pygmalion Reconsidered: A Case Study in Statistical Inference (C. A. Jones Publishing, 1971), a book on how teacher expectations affect student learning.
She served on the Analysis Advisory Committee of the National Assessment of Educational Progress beginning in the mid-1970s, and chaired the committee in 1982.

While at UCLA and Cedars-Sinai, she wrote the program nQuery Advisor, widely used to estimate the sample size requirements for pharmaceutical testing, and spun off the company Statistical Solutions LLC to commercialize it.

She has been a fellow of the American Statistical Association since 1978, following in the steps of her father who was also a fellow.

References

Year of birth missing (living people)
Living people
American women statisticians
Harvard Graduate School of Arts and Sciences alumni
Stanford University faculty
University of California, Los Angeles faculty
Fellows of the American Statistical Association
21st-century American women